The 127th IOC Session took place in December 2014 in Monte Carlo, Monaco.

Olympic Agenda 2020 

All provisions in the Olympic Agenda 2020 reform package were approved by the full IOC membership.

130th IOC Session host election 
On December 9, 2014, the IOC members voted for the city that will host the 131st IOC Session in 2017.

Recognition of Kosovo 
The IOC approved Kosovo's inclusion as a full member of the Committee, allowed the country to participate in Rio 2016 under its national flag. The IOC code for Kosovo Olympic Team is KOS.

See also 
 123rd IOC Session
 125th IOC Session
 128th IOC Session

References 

International Olympic Committee sessions
2014 conferences
Sport in Monaco
21st century in Monaco
2014 in Monégasque sport
Historical events in Monaco